Rye was a parliamentary constituency centred on the town of Rye in East Sussex. It returned two Members of Parliament to the House of Commons of the Parliament of the United Kingdom until its representation was halved under the Reform Act 1832.

From the 1832 general election, Rye returned one Member of Parliament until its abolition for the 1950 general election, when the town of Rye itself was transferred to the redrawn Hastings constituency where it remained until 1955 when it returned to the re-created Rye seat.

The constituency was re-created for the 1955 general election, and abolished again for the 1983 general election.

Boundaries
1885–1918: The Municipal Boroughs of Hastings and Rye, the Sessional Divisions of Battle, Burwash, Frant, Hastings, and Rye, the ancient town of Winchelsea, and the Liberty of the Sluice and Petit Iham.

1918–1950: The Municipal Boroughs of Bexhill and Rye, the Urban District of Battle, the Rural Districts of Battle, Hastings, Rye, and Ticehurst, and in the Rural District of Hailsham the civil parishes of Heathfield, Herstmonceux, Hooe, Ninfield, Warbleton, and Wartling.

1955–1983: The Municipal Boroughs of Bexhill and Rye, the Rural District of Battle, and part of the Rural District of Hailsham.

Members of Parliament

MPs 1366–1640

MPs 1640–1832

MPs 1832–1950

MPs 1955–1983

Elections

Elections in the 1830s
Bonham resigned, causing a by-election.

 15 votes for De Lacy Evans were rejected but, after petition, he was declared elected on 17 May 1830 and Pusey's election was declared void.

 200 inhabitants voted for Evans and Smith, but these were rejected

 A riot broke out during the poll and it was then agreed that Pusey withdrew from the contest on the condition that De Lacy Evan's party would protect the peace of the town. Just three electors polled on the second day.

Elections in the 1840s

Curteis' death caused a by-election.

Curteis' election was declared void on petition on 27 March 1848, due to insufficient notice being given of the election, causing a by-election.

Elections in the 1850s

Mackinnon was unseated when his election was declared void on petition due to bribery and treating, causing a by-election. £220 was left behind a sofa cushion  at the Red Lion to pay for a dinner.

Elections in the 1860s

Elections in the 1870s

Elections in the 1880s

Elections in the 1890s

Elections in the 1900s

Elections in the 1910s

Elections in the 1920s

Elections in the 1930s

Elections in the 1940s 
General Election 1939–40:
Another General Election was required to take place before the end of 1940. The political parties had been making preparations for an election to take place from 1939 and by the end of this year, the following candidates had been selected;
 Conservative: George Courthope
 Independent Progressive: John Langdon-Davies

Elections in the 1950s

Elections in the 1960s

Elections in the 1970s

Notes

References
 Robert Beatson, A Chronological Register of Both Houses of Parliament (London: Longman, Hurst, Res & Orme, 1807) 
 D Brunton & D H Pennington, Members of the Long Parliament (London: George Allen & Unwin, 1954)
 Cobbett's Parliamentary history of England, from the Norman Conquest in 1066 to the year 1803 (London: Thomas Hansard, 1808) titles A-Z
 F W S Craig, British Parliamentary Election Results 1832–1885 (2nd edition, Aldershot: Parliamentary Research Services, 1989)
 J E Neale, The Elizabethan House of Commons (London: Jonathan Cape, 1949)
 J Holladay Philbin, Parliamentary Representation 1832 - England and Wales (New Haven: Yale University Press, 1965)
 Robert Walcott, English Politics in the Early Eighteenth Century (Oxford: Oxford University Press, 1956)
 

History of East Sussex
Parliamentary constituencies in South East England (historic)
Constituencies of the Parliament of the United Kingdom established in 1366
Constituencies of the Parliament of the United Kingdom disestablished in 1950
Constituencies of the Parliament of the United Kingdom established in 1955
Constituencies of the Parliament of the United Kingdom disestablished in 1983
Politics of East Sussex
Rother District
Rye, East Sussex
Cinque ports parliament constituencies